Dominique Jerome Charles Baes (3 February 1893 – 26 August 1918) was a Belgian footballer. He played in one match for the Belgium national football team in 1913. He died of wounds received in action during World War I while serving in the Belgian Army.

References

External links
 

1893 births
1918 deaths
Belgian footballers
Belgium international footballers
Place of birth missing
Association football defenders
Belgian Army personnel of World War I
Belgian military personnel killed in World War I
Belgian Army officers